Kərimbəyli (also, Kerimbeyli) is a village and municipality in the Fuzuli District of Azerbaijan.  It has a population of 2,403.

References 

Populated places in Fuzuli District